Jiří Čtyřoký (20 March 1911 – 9 April 2004) was a Czech basketball player. He competed in the men's tournament at the 1936 Summer Olympics.

References

External links
 

1911 births
2004 deaths
Czech men's basketball players
Olympic basketball players of Czechoslovakia
Basketball players at the 1936 Summer Olympics
Place of birth missing